The Fair Haven Union High School (FHUHS) is a public high school located in Rutland County, Vermont, United States. It serves about 350 students from the towns of Orwell, Castleton, Benson, Hubbardton, West Haven, and Fair Haven. FHUHS is a part of the Slate Valley Unified School District (SVUSD). The current principal is Ben Worthing. The current curriculum director is Casey 
O'Meara.

References

External links 
Fair Haven Union High School website

Public high schools in Vermont
Schools in Rutland County, Vermont